The 1903–04 Seton Hall Pirates men's basketball team represented Seton Hall University during the 1903–04 college men's basketball season. The team finished with an overall record of 2–3–1.

Schedule

|-

References

Seton Hall Pirates men's basketball seasons
Seton Hall
Seton Hall
Seton Hall